Magaddino may refer to:
Stefano Magaddino, Italian-American mobster in the Buffalo crime family
Peter Magaddino, American mobster in the Buffalo crime family, son of above

See also
Buffalo crime family, also known as the Magaddino crime family

Italian-language surnames